The Mustavaara mine is one of the largest vanadium mines in Finland. The mine is located in Oulu Province. The mine has reserves amounting to 30 million tonnes of ore grading 0.91% vanadium.

References 

Vanadium mines in Finland